Miltochrista apuncta is a moth of the family Erebidae. It was described by Walter Rothschild in 1915. It is found on Seram in Indonesia.

References

apuncta
Moths described in 1915
Moths of Indonesia